Anthony Connell (born 27 January 1944) is a Scottish former football player and coach. He played for Third Lanark, St Mirren and Queen of the South in the Scottish Football League and also played Junior football with Pollok for his final two seasons, then coached them for one season after his retirement.

Playing career
Connell was born in Govan; he started his senior career with Third Lanark in 1963, moving from local junior team Strathclyde alongside Alan Mackay. The Cathkin Park club were relegated to Scottish Division Two in his second season. He played 91 times for Thirds, scoring once before moving to St Mirren after Thirds went bust in 1967 (he had played in the club's final game against Dumbarton). Saints won promotion to Scottish Division One in his first season with the club as they won the league. He was named their Player of the Year in 1969–70, before leaving at the end of the next season. He made a total of 114 appearances scoring once. He joined Queen of the South in Division Two in 1971 and left in 1974, playing 59 games and scoring once. After this he played for Pollok for two seasons, then coached the junior club for a further season.

In 2007, he was inducted into the St Mirren hall of fame.

Personal life
Connell was a part-time footballer and also worked for Glasgow Corporation Housing Department throughout his career.

References

1944 births
Living people
Third Lanark A.C. players
Pollok F.C. players
Queen of the South F.C. players
St Mirren F.C. players
Scottish footballers
Footballers from Glasgow
Association football fullbacks
Scottish Football League players
Strathclyde F.C. players
Scottish Junior Football Association players
People from Govan